The bombing of Romania in World War II comprised two series of events: until August 1944, Allied operations, and, following the overthrow of Ion Antonescu's dictatorship, operations by Nazi Germany.

The primary target of Allied operations was Ploiești, the major site of Romania's oil industry. The largest refinery there—Astra Română—processed  of petroleum a year, providing much of the fuel for the German military. Other attacks were against Bucharest, the country's capital.

1941 
The first airstrikes against Romania occurred after Romania joined the Third Reich in June 1941 during their invasion of the Soviet Union. In the following two months, Soviet Air Forces conducted several attacks against the King Carol I Bridge, destroying one of its spans and damaging an oil pipeline; see Zveno project. However, after the successful Axis powers' Crimean campaign and overall deterioration of the Soviet position, Soviet attacks against Romania ceased.

1942–1943 

The United States Army Air Forces first dropped bombs on Romania on 12 June 1942, during the Halverson project (HALPRO) raid against Ploiești – the first U.S. mission against a European target. Thirteen B-24 Liberator heavy bombers under the command of Colonel Harry A. Halverson from RAF Fayid, Egypt, dropped eight bombs into the Black Sea, two onto Constanța, six onto Ploiești, six onto Teișani, and several onto Ciofliceni. In all, three people were killed and damage was minor.

The bombing of Ploiești on 1 August 1943 (Operation Tidal Wave) was a far more serious affair. Tidal Wave heavily damaged four refineries and more lightly affected three; it damaged the Ploiești rail station but did not have much impact on the city itself. Câmpina was more severely damaged; 660 American aircrew were killed or captured, while petroleum exports exceeded pre–Tidal Wave levels by October.

1944

Anglo-American bombers first attacked Bucharest on 4 April 1944, aiming mainly to interrupt military transports from Romania to the Eastern Front. Lasting for two hours, the operation destroyed hundreds of buildings and killed or injured over 5,000 people according to unofficial statistics.

Following King Mihai I's 23 August coup against Antonescu, the Luftwaffe retaliated from 23 to 25 August, and destroyed several buildings in Bucharest until their base just north of the city in Otopeni was itself bombed by the USAAF and RAF.

References

Romania
Bombing of Romania in World War II
Romania